Wortham High School is a public high school located in Wortham, Texas (USA) and is classified as a 2A school by the UIL.  It is part of the Wortham Independent School District which serves students in far western Freestone County.  In 2015, the school was rated "Met Standard" by the Texas Education Agency.

Athletics
The Wortham Bulldogs compete in these sports - 

Cross Country, Volleyball, Football, Basketball, Powerlifting, Track, Tennis, Golf, Softball & Baseball

State titles
Boys Basketball - 
1997(1A)
Boys Track - 
1978(B)

Notable alumni
 Charlie Davis - former National Football League (NFL) player
 Leonard Davis - former NFL player

References

External links
Wortham ISD

Schools in Freestone County, Texas
Public high schools in Texas